Melitina Dmitryevna Staniouta (born 15 November 1993) is a Belarusian retired individual rhythmic gymnast. She is a three-time (2015, 2013, 2010) World all-around bronze medalist, the 2015 European Games all-around bronze medalist, the 2014 European Championships all-around silver medalist, and 2009 Grand Prix Final all-around bronze medalist.

Personal life 
Melitina is the great-granddaughter of Belarusian actress Stefaniya Staniouta. Staniouta speaks Belarusian, Russian, English and French.

In 2020 via her Instagram account, she expressed criticism of the re-election of President Alexander Lukashenko and documented police brutality against Belarusian citizens during peaceful anti-government protests. She was one of 400 Belarusian athletes to publicly criticize the election results of the 2020 presidential election in Belarus. Due to her political activism, she fled her home in Minsk.  In early 2022, she went to Kyiv, where she lived in exile before the Ukraine-Russian invasion. She has criticized the Ukraine-Russian invasion on social media. She resides Rueil-Malmaison, a suburb of Paris where she coaches rhythmic gymnastics.

Junior career 
Staniouta first took up the sport of rhythmic gymnastics in 1998. In 2005, she started to train with former Belarusian rhythmic gymnast Larissa Loukianenko, and she was included in the national team.

Staniouta won a number of junior medals, including at the 2008 European Junior Championships winning the silver medal in ribbon and rope.

Senior career 
2009-2012

In 2009, Staniouta debuted as a senior and won two medals at the 2009 World Championships in Mie. She won bronze in the rope event at the Rhythmic Gymnastics FIG World Cup Series in Pesaro 2009 and All-around at the 2009 Grand Prix Final in Berlin. At the 2009 World Cup Series' last stage, she won the bronze medal in All-around, a silver medal for rope, and bronze medals for hoop, ball and ribbon in the finals.

Staniouta repeated her success in 2010 and won the bronze medal in the All-around at the World Cup Series' last stage. She was also the all around bronze medalist and won a bronze in rope finals at the 2010 World Championships, she broke her foot during competition but continued to compete. Following the event she had an iron pin put into her foot and missed several months of competition. She also suffered a broken finger, leg and collarbone in 2010. In 2011, Staniouta continued to struggled with injuries throughout the World Cup and Grand Prix season.

In 2012, Staniouta competed at the 2012 European Championships and finished 6th in All-around. At the World Cup series in Minsk, she won bronze medals in hoop, clubs and ribbon final ahead of fellow Belarusian Liubov Charkashyna. She competed in her first Olympics in 2012 London and finished 12th at the qualifications but did not advance to the Top 10 finals.

2013

Staniouta returned to competition in the 2013 season under the new Code of Points system in rhythmic gymnastics. She won the silver medal in all-around at the first World Cup series held in Tartu, Estonia. At the Thiais Grand Prix, Staniouta won bronze medal in clubs, hoop and ribbon finals. At the second World Cup series of the season held in Lisbon, Portugal, Staniouta won the silver medal in ribbon and bronze in clubs final. She won her first World Cup all-around gold medal at the 2013 Irina Deleanu Cup, edging out Ukrainian Alina Maksymenko (silver) and Russian Daria Svatkovskaya (bronze). Staniouta won the 2013 World Cup Pesaro in all-around beating Russians Maria Titova and Daria Svatkovskaya for the gold, she won three gold medals at the event finals in ball, clubs and ribbon. At the 2013 Corbeil-Essonnes World Cup, Staniouta won the silver in All-around, she won another silver medal in ball and bronze in clubs final. She competed in home crowd at the 2013 Minsk World Cup where she won bronze in all-around, she was able to win two gold medals in the event finals in clubs and ribbon. Staniouta then competed at the 2013 European Championships in Vienna, Austria and together with her teammates ( Katsiaryna Halkina and Arina Charopa) won the Team bronze medal. She won bronze in hoop and clubs final. Staniouta competed at the  2013 Summer Universiade in Kazan where she won silver in hoop behind Margarita Mamun. Staniouta won 2 gold medals (clubs and ball) at the 2013 World Games in Cali beating Ukrainians Rizatdinova and Maksymenko. At the 2013 World Cup series in St.Petersburg, Russia, Staniouta won the silver in all-around ahead of Russian Yana Kudryavtseva and won bronze medals in hoop, clubs final. At the 2013 World Championships in Kyiv, Ukraine, Staniouta qualified to all 4 event finals where she won bronze medals in ribbon and ball, placed 5th in hoop and 7th in clubs. She won the All-around bronze medal at the 2013 World Championships with an overall score of 72.166 points. In October, she competed at the 2013 Grand Prix Brno and won bronze in the all-around, hoop, ball, ribbon and silver in clubs. On October 25–27, Staniouta competed at the World Club Championship, the 2013 Aeon Cup in Tokyo, Japan representing team Dinamo (together with teammate Katsiaryna Halkina) won the team silver. She also won the silver medal in the All-around finals ahead of Mamun.

2014

Staniouta began the 2014 season by competing at LA Lights and won the all-around gold medal ahead of Rizatdinova. She finished 7th in all-around at the 2014 Moscow Grand Prix and won bronze medal in ball. In her next event, Staniouta finished 6th in all-round at the 2014 Thiais Grand Prix and won gold medal in ribbon ( tied with Ganna Rizatdinova ). She competed at the 2014 Stuttgart World Cup where she finished 4th in all-around. In event finals: she won silver in ball and 3 bronze medals (in hoop, clubs and ribbon). Staniouta then won silver in all-around at the 2014 Lisboa World Cup, she qualified to 3 event finals where she won gold in hoop and silver in ball. Following her next event at the 2014 Pesaro World Cup, she finished 8th in all-around and won bronze medal in clubs final. On May 3–5, Staniouta then competed at the 2014 Kalamata Cup and won the all-around gold medal. On May 22–24, Staniouta competed at the 2014 Tashkent World Cup where she finished 5th in all-around behind Neta Rivkin. She qualified to all 4 event finals winning 3 silver medals (hoop, clubs, ribbon) and bronze in ball. In her next event, Staniouta won the all-around silver medal at the 2014 Minsk World Cup ahead of Margarita Mamun. In the event finals, she won gold in ribbon and bronze (clubs, ball). On June 10–15, Staniouta went to collect the silver medal in the individual all around competition at the 2014 European Championships in Baku, Azerbaijan, being the first all-around medal for a Belarusian gymnast, 14 years later since Yulia Raskina at the 2000 European Championships in Zaragoza. On August 8–10, Staniouta then competed at the 2014 Sofia World Cup and finished 4th in all-around after a last seconds roll out of her ball and drop in her clubs. She qualified to 2 event finals winning silver in hoop and ribbon. On September 5–7, competing at the 2014 World Cup series in Kazan, Staniouta took the all-around bronze medal with a total of 72.350 points. She qualified to all 4 event finals and won 2 silver (in clubs, ribbon), a bronze in ball and 5th in hoop. On September 22–28, Staniouta (along with teammates Katsiaryna Halkina and Arina Charopa) represented Belarus at the 2014 World Championships where they took the Team silver with a total of 136.073 points. She qualified to 3 event finals taking bronze in ball, 4th in ribbon and 7th in clubs. In the all-around, Staniouta ended up finishing 7th overall after a few errant mistakes and drop from her clubs and ball routine. On October 17–19, Staniouta traveled in Tokyo for the 2014 Aeon Cup, representing team Dinamo club (together with teammate Katsiaryna Halkina and junior Mariya Trubach) won the team silver. She won the All-around bronze medal in the finals ahead of Ganna Rizatdinova.

2015

In the 2015 season, Staniouta's first competition was at the 2015 L.A. Lights where she won the all-around silver medal behind Ukraine's Ganna Rizatdinova. At the 2015 Moscow Grand Prix, she won the all-around bronze medal. In event finals, she won gold in clubs, silver in (hoop, ball) and 4th in ribbon. She then competed at the 2015 Baltic Hoop and won the all-around gold ahead of senior debutant Irina Annenkova. In the event finals, Staniouta took gold in hoop, silver in clubs and bronze in ribbon. On April 3–5, Staniouta competed at the 2015 Bucharest World Cup and finished all-around bronze, in apparatus finals, she won bronze in hoop, ball, ribbon and placed 6th in clubs. On April 10–12, Staniouta placed 5th in all-around at the 2015 Pesaro World Cup behind Ukraine's Ganna Rizatdinova, she qualified to 4 event finals taking silver in ball, bronze in hoop, ribbon and placing 8th in clubs. At the 2015 European Championships in Minsk, Staniouta won a total of 5 medals: silver in (hoop, ribbon, team) and bronze (clubs, ball). At the 2015 Grand Prix Berlin, Staniouta won the all-around silver behind Margarita Mamun, she qualified to all 4 event finals and won gold in ribbon, bronze in hoop, ball and clubs. On June 15–21, Staniouta competed at the inaugural 2015 European Games where she won the all-around bronze with a total of 73.100 points (a PB), she qualified to all 4 apparatus finals: taking silver in hoop, bronze in ball, clubs and 4th in ribbon. Her next competition was at the 2015 Summer Universiade in Gwangju, Korea were Staniouta won the all-around bronze behind Ganna Rizatdinova. She qualified to all apparatus finals taking gold in ribbon, silver in clubs, bronze in hoop and 4th in ball. In August, Staniouta competed at the 2015 Budapest World Cup winning bronze in the all-around, in apparatus finals, she won bronze in hoop, ball, clubs and finished 6th in ribbon. In her next competition at the 2015 Sofia World Cup, Staniouta finished 4th in the all-around behind Ganna Rizatdinova. She qualified to all the apparatus finals taking silver in ball, bronze in hoop, placed 4th in clubs and 5th in ribbon. At the 2015 World Cup series in Kazan, Staniouta finished 4th in the all-around behind Aleksandra Soldatova, Staniouta qualified to all apparatus finals taking bronze in ball, ribbon, finished 5th in hoop and 8th in clubs. On September 9–13, Staniouta (together with teammates Katsiaryna Halkina, Hanna Bazhko and Arina Charopa) competed at the 2015 World Championships in Stuttgart, with Team Belarus winning the silver medal. Staniouta also qualified to all apparatus finals taking bronze in ball, 4th in (hoop, clubs, ribbon) and in the all-around finals; Staniouta finished 3rd edging out Salome Pazhava of Georgia for the bronze medal. On October 2–4, Staniouta together with teammates Arina Charopa and junior Yulia Isachanka represented Team Dinamo Minsk at the 2015 Aeon Cup in Tokyo Japan, Staniouta finished 4th in the individual all-around finals and with team Belarus finishing 3rd in the overall standings.

2016

In 2016, Staniouta began her season by competing at the 2016 Grand Prix Moscow finishing 5th in the all-around and took a bronze in clubs final. On February 26–28, Staniouta competed in the first World Cup of the season at the 2016 Espoo World Cup finishing 4th in the all-around behind Korean Son Yeon-Jae; she won bronze in clubs, ball, placed 9th in hoop and 7th in ball. On March 12–13, Staniouta competed at the MTM Tournament in Ljubljana, Slovenia where she won the all-around silver with a total of 73.350 points behind Russian Margarita Mamun in the apparatus finals; she won gold in ball and silver in hoop, clubs, ribbon. At the 30th Thiais Grand Prix event in Paris, Staniouta won the all-around bronze ahead of Ganna Rizatdinova, she won bronze medals in hoop, ball clubs and silver in ribbon final. On April 1–3, Staniouta competed at the 2016 Pesaro World Cup where she finished 6th in the all-around, she qualified 3 event finals: took bronze in ball, 4th in hoop, and 5th in ribbon. On May 6–8, Staniouta competed at the Brno Grand Prix taking silver in the all-around with a total of 74.600 points; she qualified to all 4 apparatus finals winning silver in ball, clubs, bronze in hoop and 4th in ribbon. On May 13–15, Staniouta won the all-around gold at the Bucharest Grand Prix with a total of 74.150 points, ahead of the Averina Twins (Arina and Dina) respectively. She qualified to all apparatus finals: taking gold in hoop, ball, ribbon and placed 4th in clubs. She won bronze in the all-around at the 2016 Minsk World Cup with a total of 73.950 points, in the event finals: she won a silver in hoop, 2 bronze medals (ball, clubs) and placed 5th in ribbon. On June 3–5, Staniouta then finished 5th in the all-around behind Son Yeon-Jae at the 2016 Guadalajara World Cup, she finished 5th in (hoop, ball, clubs) and won silver in ribbon finals. On June 17–19, Staniouta competed at the 2016 European Championships where she finished in 4th place with a total of 73.715 points. On July 1–3, Staniouta competed at the 2016 Berlin World Cup winning the All-around silver with a total of 73.900 points behind Russia's Dina Averina, Staniouta qualified to all apparatus finals winning gold in hoop (tied with Ganna Rizatdinova), silver in ball, clubs and bronze in ribbon (tied with Salome Pazhava). On July 8–10, Staniouta then finished 5th in the all-around at the 2016 Kazan World Cup with a total of 74.150 points behind Korea's Son Yeon-Jae, Staniouta qualified to 3 apparatus finals winning silver in ribbon and bronze in ball, clubs.

On August 19–20, Staniouta competed at the 2016 Summer Olympics held in Rio de Janeiro, Brazil. She qualified to the rhythmic gymnastics individual all-around final where she finished 5th overall after a drop in her clubs routine.

On December 23, Staniouta announced her retirement from her sport and culminating her career in the 2016 Season.

Endorsements 
Staniouta has appeared in a commercial ad for Bon Aqua. She is also one of Belarus' United Nations High Commissioner for Refugees Celebrity representatives.

Routine music information

References

External links
 
 
 
 
 

1993 births
Living people
Gymnasts from Minsk
Belarusian rhythmic gymnasts
Gymnasts at the 2012 Summer Olympics
Gymnasts at the 2016 Summer Olympics
Olympic gymnasts of Belarus
Gymnasts at the 2015 European Games
European Games medalists in gymnastics
European Games silver medalists for Belarus
European Games bronze medalists for Belarus
Medalists at the Rhythmic Gymnastics World Championships
Medalists at the Rhythmic Gymnastics European Championships
World Games gold medalists
World Games silver medalists
World Games bronze medalists
Universiade medalists in gymnastics
Competitors at the 2009 World Games
Competitors at the 2013 World Games
Universiade gold medalists for Belarus
Universiade silver medalists for Belarus
Universiade bronze medalists for Belarus
Medalists at the 2013 Summer Universiade
Medalists at the 2015 Summer Universiade